The Constable of the Tower is the most senior appointment at the Tower of London. In the Middle Ages a constable was the person in charge of a castle when the owner—the king or a nobleman—was not in residence. The Constable of the Tower had a unique importance as the person in charge of the principal fortress defending the capital city of England.

Today the role of Constable is a ceremonial one and mainly involves taking part in traditional ceremonies within the Tower as well as being part of the community that lives within its perimeter. The Constable is also a trustee of Historic Royal Palaces and of the Royal Armouries.

Under the King's Regulations for the Army, the office of Constable is conferred upon a field marshal or a retired general officer for a five-year term. The Constable appointed in 2022 is General Sir Gordon Messenger. The Constable's ceremonial deputy is the Lieutenant of the Tower of London, currently Sir George Norton;
this office is generally entrusted to a general officer of lower rank than the Constable.

At the conclusion of the Constable's installation ceremony, the Lord Chamberlain symbolically hands over the King's House to the Constable. He in turn entrusts it to the Resident Governor, who is responsible for the day-to-day running of His Majesty's Palace and Fortress, the Tower of London.

History 
The office of Constable of the Tower is one of the oldest in England, dating back to within a few years of the Conquest, and has always been one of great honour and dignity. In the past, this appointment has been held by eminent prelates of the Church, prominent politicians and distinguished soldiers. The first Constable, Geoffrey de Mandeville was appointed by William the Conqueror (AD 1066-87) in the 11th century. Formerly, in the absence of the Sovereign, the Constable would have been among the most powerful men in London. Today the Constable retains the right of direct access to the Sovereign. Since 1784 the Constable has always been a senior military officer.

During the medieval period the Constable ran the Tower which included building maintenance, soldiers' pay and, as the Royal menagerie was housed in the Tower, supervision of the 'Keeper of the King's Animals'. He was also ultimately responsible for the prisoners kept there. The first known prisoner was the Norman bishop Ranulf Flambard in 1100, and the London gangsters Ronnie and Reggie Kray were the last official prisoners, for a few days in 1952, for refusing to do their National Service. They were sent to the Tower as it was the barracks of the 1st Battalion Royal Fusiliers (City of London Regiment) to which they had been assigned.

The Constable's responsibility for prisoners was made clear in the words with which he was entrusted with them: "You are to guard them securely in the prison of our said tower in such a way that you shall answer for them body for body ... Fail in no part of this on pain of forfeiture of life and limb and all property you hold in our realms."

Until the expulsion of the Jews in 1290, the Constable was responsible for the regulation and protection of London's Jewry.

The Lieutenant of the Tower was the Constable's deputy, and de facto head once the Constable became a ceremonial sinecure. The Lieutenant in turn became a ceremonial post, with real function delegated to a Deputy-Lieutenant and a Major; the latter post evolved into the current Resident Governor. 

The five-year term of office was introduced in 1932. For two centuries prior it was typically held for life, although some holders resigned.

Lord Lieutenant of the Tower Hamlets

The Constable also held the office of Lord Lieutenant of the Tower Hamlets, which existed from the Restoration until 1889, and had authority with the Tower division of the hundred of Ossulstone. In the 17th century, Ossulstone, the urbanising part of Middlesex which bordered the City of London, was split into four divisions, of which the Tower division lay east of the City, compassing all the modern London borough of Tower Hamlets and most of that of Hackney. The division was also called Tower Hamlets, after the hamlets (later to become parishes) of the ancient parish of Stepney. Each Ossulstone division had status equivalent to that of a hundred, while Tower division had some extra powers normally reserved for a county, in particular its own Lord Lieutenant. This enabled the Constable, as Lord Lieutenant, to raise local militia forces to supplement the Tower garrison at times of increased tension, or for use in the field. A 1662 act of Parliament restricting the power of levying militia to [lord-]lieutenants had a saver for the Constable:

The offices of Constable and Lord Lieutenant were awarded by separate letters patent, usually simultaneously. Exceptionally, in 1715, Hatton Compton was made Lord Lieutenant of the Tower Hamlets and Lieutenant of the Tower, whereas Charles Howard, 3rd Earl of Carlisle, made Constable in 1715, did not replace Compton as Lord Lieutenant until 1717. The Constable of the Tower is not to be confused with the "High Constable of the Tower Division": the High Constable of a hundred  or division had charge of the parish constables of its constituent parishes.  A Lord Lieutenant could commission deputy lieutenants. The Deputy Lieutenants of the Tower Hamlets (listed below) are not to be confused with the abovementioned Deputy-Lieutenant of the Tower. The County of London created in 1889 included the area of Tower Hamlets, and the new Lord Lieutenant of the County of London took over the Tower Hamlets lieutenancy's functions.

Constable's dues 
In the Middle Ages it was a profitable position; among the Constable's entitlements were:
 any horses, oxen, pigs or sheep that fell off London Bridge
 any cart that fell into the Tower moat
 all herbage growing on Tower Hill
 6/8d (six shillings and eight pence) annually from each boat fishing between the Tower and the sea
 1s (1 shilling) a year from all ships carrying herring to London
 2d (2 pence) from each pilgrim who came to London, by sea, to worship at the shrine of St James
 all swans swimming under London Bridge.

Every ship that came upstream to London had to moor at Tower Wharf to give a portion of its cargo to the Constable, as payment for the protection afforded by the Tower's cannon. These dues included oysters, mussels, cockles, rushes, and wine. The tradition is still maintained today by the Royal Navy, at the annual Ceremony of the Constable's Dues, when one large vessel presents the Constable with a barrel of rum.

Since 1784 the tradition has been for the Constable to be a senior military officer, usually a general officer. Perhaps the most famous Constable was Arthur Wellesley, 1st Duke of Wellington, who served from 1825 to 1852. During his tenure, the royal menagerie and record office were removed and many buildings were restored to their medieval state. The moat was drained and converted into a parade ground. Yeomen Warders were no longer permitted to buy and sell their places but were to be drawn only from sergeants in the Army. To His Grace's displeasure, tourism at the Tower increased during his Constableship.

Each Constable is now appointed for five years. The new Constable is handed the keys as a symbol of office. On state occasions the Constable has custody of the crown and other royal jewels.

List

Deputy lieutenants
A deputy lieutenant of the Tower Hamlets was commissioned by the Lord Lieutenant of the Tower Hamlets. Deputy lieutenants support the work of the lord-lieutenant. 

28 June 1831: Charles Bradshaw Stutfield, Esq.
14 March 1846: Frederick Hodgson, Esq.
1 March, 1870: Sir Bruce Maxwell Seton, Bart; William Wainwright, Esq.; James Ebenezer Saunders, Esq.

Notes

References

External links 
 Channel 4; The Tower
 Historic Royal Palaces; Constable of the Tower

Tower Hamlets
 
History of the London Borough of Tower Hamlets
Tower of London
Tower of London